Chinese song is an art form of China.

Chinese Songs may refer to:
Chinese Songs (Tcherepnin), by Alexander Tcherepnin
6 Chinese Songs, sung in Hungarian, by György Kósa (1897-1984) 
8 Chinese Songs, for pipa by Zhou Long (b.1953) 
Two Chinese Folk Songs, for piano, by Ronald Stevenson (1928-2015) 
2 Chinese Songs, for soprano and piano by Marga Richter (b.1926)
6 Chinese Songs, Op. 13, sung in Hungarian by Zoltán Horusitzky (1903-85)